Aldo Zenhäusern (3 August 19519 January 2012) was a Swiss ice hockey player. He participated at the 1976 Winter Olympics. He was born in Visp, Switzerland and is the father of Gerd Zenhäusern, who was also a hockey player.

References 

1951 births
2012 deaths
Olympic ice hockey players of Switzerland
Ice hockey players at the 1976 Winter Olympics